CIPS may refer to:

 Canadian Information Processing Society
 Chartered Institute of Procurement & Supply
 Center for Integrated Plasma Studies
 Certified Interventional Ultrasound Sonographer, a qualification issued by the World Institute of Pain
 Cross-Border Inter-Bank Payments System
 Confédération Internationale de la Pêche Sportive (International Confederation of Sport Fishing)
 Cooperative Institute for Precipitation Systems
 Covington Independent Public Schools
 International Conference on Integrated Power Electronics Systems